Captain Underpants is an illustrated children's novel series by American author and illustrator Dav Pilkey. The series revolves around two fourth graders, George Beard and Harold Hutchins, living in Piqua, Ohio, and Captain Underpants, an aptly named superhero from one of the boys' homemade comic books, who accidentally becomes real when George and Harold hypnotize their cruel, bossy, and ill-tempered principal, Mr. Krupp. From the third book onwards, Mr. Krupp also possesses superhuman strength, durability and flight as a result of drinking alien "Extra-Strength Super Power Juice".

Currently, the series includes 12 books, two activity books, 15 spin-offs, and won a Kids' Choice Award on April 4, 2006. As of 2014, the series has been translated into more than 20 languages, with more than 80 million books sold worldwide, including over 50 million in the United States. DreamWorks Animation acquired the rights to the series to make an animated feature film adaptation, Captain Underpants: The First Epic Movie, which was released on June 2, 2017, to positive reviews.

After the main series concluded with the twelfth novel, Captain Underpants and the Sensational Saga of Sir Stinks-A-Lot, in 2015, a spin-off series titled Dog Man was released the following year. The spin-off series has eleven books so far.

Characters

Overview 
List indicator(s):
 A dark grey cell indicates that the character was not in the property or that the character's presence in the property has yet to be announced.
 A Main indicates a character had a starring role in the property.
 A Supporting indicates the character appeared in two or more times within the property.
 A Guest indicates the character appeared once in the property.

Main
 George Beard and Harold Hutchins  – Two fourth-grade clever pranksters, who are best friends, next-door neighbors and the main protagonists of the series. They started a comic book company called "Treehouse Comix, Inc.", and every so often at school they sneak to the secretary's office to make copies of their latest comic book and sell them on the playground for 50 cents. They are the class clowns in 4th grade at Jerome Horwitz Elementary School (named for Curly of the Three Stooges), a school which discourages imagination and fun, located in Piqua, Ohio. They often get in trouble and serious events with Mr. Krupp. Harold's birthday is March 6, 1986, and George's is July 11, 1986. After time travel antics, duplicates of them are created in the present, referred to as Yesterday George and Yesterday Harold. After the original duo travel to the future, they find their others selves to have become graphic novel creators. Future Yesterday George married a white woman named Lisa and had two mixed-race children named Meena and Nik. Future Yesterday Harold married a man named Billy and had adopted twin children named Owen and Kei. George's parents are named Moses and Barbara, while Harold's mother is named Grace. George's grandmother and Harold's grandfather appear in the eighth book, where they unknowingly drink the last of the superpower juice while reading a comic the boys created where they are the heroes. They later transform into the same heroes to defend George and Harold from Captain Blunderpants and profess their love to each other, much to the boys' disgust. In the adaptations, their personalities are mostly unchanged, but they now usually only prank to entertain their schoolmates and treat Captain Underpants more as a friend than a last resort. In the film, they are respectively voiced by Kevin Hart and Thomas Middleditch and by Ramone Hamilton and Jay Gragnani in the series.
 Mr. Benjamin "Benny" Krupp  – The cruel and mean-spirited principal of Jerome Horwitz Elementary School and the antihero of the series (usually when no real dangers are happening). He is usually depicted as an overweight man. Mr. Krupp has a deep hatred of children and also tries to protect the students at Jerome Horwitz Elementary from George and Harold's pranks. Why he is so mean to children, in general, is unknown, but it is hinted that it is because of his own troubled and dysfunctional past. Mr. Krupp's birthday is on April 1, 1951; he has a younger brother named Jasper (Kipper's father), and his parents are named John and Bernice. When Mr. Krupp was little, he performed an awful hip-hop dance at a talent show, his mother passed out fruits and vegetables to the audience so they could throw them at him because he did not watch the cows from his family farm. This leads him to become mean, cold-hearted and vow to make all kids feel just as bad as he did. His last name is a pun of the word "corrupt". When he goes by his full name, it is a pun on "bankrupt". Mr. Krupp was based on Mr. Crutch, and was supposed to be named Mr. Crutch. He was named after Mr. Crutch from Shrimps for a Day. In the film, it is revealed that he read George and Harold's comics when he confiscated them and felt they were a little funny, which explains how he knows what Captain Underpants acts like when he is hypnotized. In the film, he is voiced by Ed Helms and in the series, he is voiced by Nat Faxon.
 Captain Underpants  – The superhero counterpart and alter ego of Mr. Krupp, when he is hypnotized to think he is "Captain Underpants", a character created by George and Harold. He only wears briefs and a red cape with black polka dots. Whenever Mr. Krupp hears the sound of fingers snapping, he turns into Captain Underpants and he turns back into Mr. Krupp when he is soaked with water. Captain Underpants gains superpowers in the third book and possessed superhuman strength, durability, flight and "wedgie power" where he can pull unlimited underwear from his utility waistband. As the book series went on, Captain Underpants seemed to have increasingly minor roles in each installment. In the 12th book, he lost his superpowers and was erased from existence, much to George and Harold's apathy. Captain Underpants is considered to be the "light side" of Mr. Krupp himself, as he is nice and kind to everyone, especially children. He is very protective of the children, especially George and Harold since he believes that they're his trusty sidekicks. In the film, he is voiced by Ed Helms and in the series, he is voiced by Nat Faxon.
 Melvin Richard Sneedly  – George and Harold's nerdy nemesis. He is an annoying snitch, a genius inventor and the school's smartest student. His parents, Cindy and Gaylord, are professional scientists and are canonically neglectful. It is thought to believe that his parents' neglectful behavior and snobby attitudes contribute to his anger and snobbiness. In the Netflix series, he is thought to have been inventing ever since he was a baby and has a bizarre sense of humor, laughing at videos of rotting fruit. Apparently, in the movie, he is the only student who has no sense of humor because he thinks everything childish is not funny and only focuses on his studies so he can get extra credit. He is also said to have no brain stem (which Poopypants calls the "Hahaguffawchucklealamus"). In the eleventh book, he becomes a superhero named Big Melvin after he defeats the Turbo Toilet 2000 after he drinks superpower juice he created from a disgusting toenail from Mr. Krupp. He rescues people from emergencies, but later, people started to abuse the system by calling him, but it was not an emergency at all. He travels in time to bring Captain Underpants back to the present to defeat the Turbo Toilet 2000 so his life as a superhero would never become reality. In the film, he is voiced by Jordan Peele and in the series by Jorge Diaz.
 Sulu and Crackers  – George and Harold's pets. Sulu was Melvin's abandoned pet bionic hamster after he yelled at Sulu which offended him but afterward was adopted by George and Harold. Crackers is their pet Quetzalcoatlus they got when they traveled back in time with Melvin Sneedly's time machine. The pair then have three children together named Tony, Dawn and Orlando.

Recurring
In book 11, when the teachers saw two Georges and two Harolds, they think they are dreaming and then they go naked. They are arrested when Miss Fitt pulled down Officer McWiggly's pants. Mr Hand in the series gets hired.
 Mr. Kenny Brian Meaner – Mr. Meaner is Jerome Horwitz Elementary School's gym teacher. He is depicted as being an overweight man and with a personality similar to Mr. Krupp's. Like him, he is very cruel to students and often yells at them. He appears in the series, where he is depicted as being incredibly ignorant and talks in a stutter by saying "yeah yeah yeah yeah." In book 12, Meaner becomes Sir Stinks-A-Lot. His name is a pun on the word "misdemeanor" or by saying that "can he be meaner." Voiced by David Koechner in the TV series.
 Miss Edith Anthrope – The school secretary who is often shown to be in a bad mood. Like all the other teachers at the school including Mr. Krupp, she is unkind to children. She is slightly overweight, in contrast to most of the other teachers. In the movie, she is on hold for three days thinking she will win a contest with a cash prize of $1 billion. In the movie she does not speak, but in the series, she is voiced by Patty Mattson where she is glum but yells "Fine!". A running gag in the series involves her entering Mr. Krupp's office saying "Did you call me?" followed by something else she says. Her name is a pun of the word "misanthrope" or by saying "eat it/miss and throw up."
 Mr. Morty Fyde – Mr. Fyde was the science teacher at Jerome Horwitz Elementary School. Unlike all the other grown-ups in the school, he is rather dorky and stupid. The events of the first three books gradually cause him to believe himself is insane and resign from his job to put himself in a mental institution (but in the movie Mr. Krupp simply fires Fyde because he'd rather spend time with his family instead of judge the school science fair and Krupp considers this unacceptable). His name is a pun on the words "mystified" and "mortified." In the film, he is voiced by Mel Rodriguez. In the series he is voiced by Stephen Root, where he is released from the mental institution, though he becomes nervous around loud noise, which is unfortunate for Mr. Fyde; an elementary school is practically built on noise. One of Melvin's inventions accidentally fuses Mr. Fyde with an avocado pit belonging to George and Harold, turning him into a giant avocado monster named Avocadwoe that attacks everything that makes loud sounds. Mr. Fyde is planted by Captain Underpants and he is turned into an avocado tree in a peaceful forest behind the school, something that Mr. Fyde is content with.
 Ms. Tara Ribble – Ms. Ribble is the homeroom teacher of George and Harold's 4th-grade class. In book 5, she is hypnotized into becoming Wedgie Woman. Her name is a pun on the words "terrible" and "miserable." Voiced by Dee Dee Rescher in the movie and Laraine Newman in the TV series.
 Miss Singerbrains – Miss Singerbrains is the librarian at Jerome Horwitz Elementary School who banned all but one of the books in the library and eventually closed down the library. Her name is a pun on saying she is "missing her brains."
 Mr. Riles Rected – Mr. Rected is the guidance counselor at Jerome Horwitz Elementary School. He is very nasty to students, especially George and Harold, and he is often seen hanging with Mr. Krupp, Mr. Meaner, Miss Anthrope, and Ms. Ribble. His name is a pun on the word "misdirected." He is also voiced by Brian Posehn in the film and Jorge Diaz in the animated series.
 Ms. Dayken – Ms. Dayken is a member of the teaching board at Jerome Horwitz Elementary school. Her name is a pun on the word "mistaken." In the film, she is voiced by Susan Fitzer and was George and Harold's kindergarten teacher where she teaches about the planets, including "Uranus," which the boys find very amusing.
 Mr. Rusworthy – Mr. Rusworthy is (according to his tie) the music teacher of Jerome Horowitz Elementary school. His name is a pun on the word "Mistrustworthy". In the series, he is replaced by a different music teacher, Ms. Herd.
 The Lunch Ladies – The Lunch Ladies are the three women who run the cafeteria. They are notorious for cooking horrible, inedible, and possibly lethal food. They quit in the third book when Mr. Krupp says he cannot punish George and Harold for their antics without proof, though they are possibly rehired after the replacements are revealed to be aliens. Two of the Lunch Ladies are named, Miss Creant, the head lunch lady, and Mrs. DePoint, the cook. The revealed names are puns on the word "Miscreant" and the phrase "Misses the point".
 Doctor Diaper (known alternatively as Doctor Nappy in the UK) – A diaper-clad mad scientist and the first villain Captain Underpants ever faced.
 The Talking Toilets – An army of living toilets created by George and Harold, who were accidentally brought into the real world with a modified photocopier. They could only say "Yum Yum Eat em Up!"
 The Turbo Toilet 2000 – A giant toilet created by George and Harold, who was accidentally brought into the real world with a modified photocopier. After he was defeated by the Incredible Robo-Plunger, he and the other toilets were taken to Uranus where he remained for several books until being brought back to life by juice from the destroyed Robo-Plunger. In the film, it was now Melvin's invention that was grown by Poopypants with his size ray.
 The Incredible Robo-Plunger – A giant robot created by George and Harold to defeat the Turbo Toilet 2000. Afterwords, he repaired the school and took all the toilets to Uranus where he remained for several books until he was hit on the head by a kickball kicked into space by the Harold 2000. He is then rebuilt by the revived Turbo Toilet 2000 into a rocket scooter so the toilet could return to earth.
 Zorx, Klax, and Jennifer – Three space aliens who planned to invade Piqua, Ohio. They disguised themselves as lunch ladies to turn the students of Jerome Horwitz Elementary School into Zombie Nerds by using Evil Zombie Nerd Juice.
 The Dandelion of Doom – A dandelion that drank alien super evil rapid-growth juice, causing it to grow into a giant, evil monster.
 Tippy Tinkletrousers (formerly known as Professor Pippy Pee-Pee Poopypants, and in the film as Prof. Pee-Pee Diarrheastien Poopypants Esq.) – A brilliant scientist who unfortunately comes from a foreign country where everyone has a silly name. In book 4, he forces everyone on earth to change their names into a silly one. After his defeat, Professor Poopypants changes his name, suggested by George rather than forcing everybody to change theirs. But Poopypants does not change his name to something normal, instead, he changes it to his grandfather’s name Tippy Tinkletrousers. In the film, he is voiced by Nick Kroll.
 Wedgie Woman (Ms. Ribble) – A villain created by George and Harold who was based on their teacher Ms. Ribble. After a second mishap with the Hypno-Ring, it convinced her that she is Wedgie Woman. at first, she has no superpowers, but after her hairstyle gets splattered with superpower juice from the third book her hair transforms into arms and she gains super-intelligence.
 Robo-George and The Harold 2000 – Two giant robots built by Wedgie Woman based on George and Harold. They were fully obedient to Wedgie Woman; each had a vast arsenal of powerful weapons and gadgets and were programmed to destroy Captain Underpants once they heard him say "Tra-la-laaa!" 
 The Bionic Booger Boy (Melvin Sneedly) – A fusion of Melvin Sneedly, boogers, and a super-powered robot. His growth is triggered by a field trip to a tissue factory.
 Carl, Trixie and Frankenbooger (The Three Robo-Boogers) – Boogers who all come from the Bionic Booger Boy. They all share a weakness to oranges, which Captain Underpants successfully used to destroy the rampaging trio of living mucus. Carl had the Bionic Booger Boy's legs, Trixie had the tentacles, and Frankenbooger had the arms. Whenever they eat, they become bigger and more evil.
 Evil George and Evil Harold – Alternative versions and negative counterparts of George and Harold from an alternate dimension who are both intelligent and evil. They helped Captain Blunderpants and unlike the sketchy, amateurish George and Harold they are good authors and illustrators (ironically, the main George and Harold consider the alternative George and Harold's work inferior). Additionally, they also tended to change the signs into evil phrases (while their counterparts often change the signs into funny words).
 Captain Blunderpants – The opposite and evil counterpart of Captain Underpants from an alternate dimension, who has a toupee and looks and acts more like Krupp, while the alternate Krupp is nice. Also, his transformation is the opposite; when water is splashed on him, he becomes the evil Captain Blunderpants and when someone snaps their fingers, he becomes the nice Mr. Krupp.
 Kipper Krupp – A sixth-grade bully and Benjamin's nephew and Jasper Krupp's son, who would bully George, Harold, and other children when they were all in kindergarten. Due to a series of pranks that George and Harold conducted, he would eventually become nicer to the children along with his also mischievous friends Finkstein, Bugg, and Loogie.
 Sir Stinks-A-Lot (Mr. Meaner) – Mr. Meaner later becomes the alter ego of Sir Stinks-A-Lot, an evil hypnotist. While in prison, Meaner transforms into a blob of pure energy after eating an egg salad sandwich. He later removes an alternative version of Captain Underpants's superpowers and the effects of the Hypno ring, erasing him from existence entirely and giving himself, Old George and Old Harold all of Captain Underpants's superpowers and the effects of the 3D Hypno-Ring.

Novels
The main series of novels has developed a pattern of alliteration from the fourth book on—except for the third book, whose "annoyingly long" title becomes a running joke in future books.

Novels 6–12 in the main series form one unbroken story, in which the ending of each of such novel except the last is a cliffhanger, and the next novel in sequence immediately picks up where the last one left off.

Captain Underpants novels
 The Adventures of Captain Underpants (1997)
 Captain Underpants and the Attack of the Talking Toilets (1999)
 Captain Underpants and the Invasion of the Incredibly Naughty Cafeteria Ladies from Outer Space (and the Subsequent Assault of the Equally-Evil Lunchroom Zombie Nerds) (1999)
 Captain Underpants and the Perilous Plot of Professor Poopypants (2000)
 Captain Underpants and the Wrath of the Wicked Wedgie Woman (2001)
 Captain Underpants and the Big, Bad Battle of the Bionic Booger Boy, Part 1: The Night of the Nasty Nostril Nuggets (2003)
 Captain Underpants and the Big, Bad Battle of the Bionic Booger Boy, Part 2: The Revenge of the Ridiculous Robo-Boogers (2003)
 Captain Underpants and the Preposterous Plight of the Purple Potty People (2006)
 Captain Underpants and the Terrifying Return of Tippy Tinkletrousers (2012)
 Captain Underpants and the Revolting Revenge of the Radioactive Robo-Boxers (2013)
 Captain Underpants and the Tyrannical Retaliation of the Turbo Toilet 2000 (2014)
 Captain Underpants and the Sensational Saga of Sir Stinks-A-Lot (2015)

Captain Underpants activity books
 The Captain Underpants Extra-Crunchy Book o' Fun (2001)
 The All-New Captain Underpants Extra-Crunchy Book o' Fun 2 (2002)
 The Captain Underpants Super Silly Sticker Studio (2005)

Captain Underpants spin-offs
 The Adventures of Super Diaper Baby (2002)
 The Adventures of Ook and Gluk: Kung-Fu Cavemen from the Future (2010) (out of print as of March 2021)
 Super Diaper Baby 2: The Invasion of the Potty Snatchers (2011)

Dog Man
Dog Man is a comedic graphic novel series created by Dav Pilkey as a full spin-off book series to the Captain Underpants series that had just concluded. The series is about a dog-headed cop protecting the city he resides in with his friends. The book series includes ten books, the first released in 2016 and the latest in 2021. The latest book is called Dog Man: Mothering Heights and it was released on 23 March 2021.

In 2020, ten Dog Man books (including one Cat Kid Comic Club, a spin-off) sold a total of over 3.8 million copies, 13% of the total comics book sales, as charted by BookScan. This does not include digital copies or any copy sold by Scholastic through school book fairs.

On 9 December 2020, it was announced that a Dog Man feature film is in development at DreamWorks Animation with Peter Hastings directing in the helm after his experience with Dav Pilkey's works from The Epic Tales of Captain Underpants.

These books have been released or announced so far in the series:
 Dog Man (2016)
 Dog Man Unleashed (2016)
 Dog Man: A Tale of Two Kitties (2017)
 Dog Man and Cat Kid (2017)
 Dog Man: Lord Of the Fleas (2018)
 Dog Man: Brawl of the Wild (2018)
 Dog Man: For Whom The Ball Rolls (2019)
 Dog Man: Fetch-22 (2019)
 Dog Man: Grime and Punishment (2020)
 Dog Man: Mothering Heights (2021)
 Dog Man: 20 Thousand Fleas Under The Sea (2023)

The series has its own spin-off series titled Cat Kid Comic Club, with four books released:
 Cat Kid Comic Club (2020)
 Cat Kid Comic Club: Perspectives (2021)
 Cat Kid Comic Club: On Purpose (2022)
 Cat Kid Comic Club: Collaborations (2022)

Captain Underpants collectors' editions
 The Adventures of Captain Underpants: Collectors' Edition (2001)
 Captain Underpants and the Attack of the Talking Toilets: Collectors' Edition (2007)
 Captain Underpants and the Invasion of the Incredibly Naughty Cafeteria Ladies from Outer Space (and the Subsequent Assault of the Equally-Evil Lunchroom Zombie Nerds): Collectors' Edition (2008)

Captain Underpants collections
 The Tra-La-La Riffic Captain Underpants Collection/The First Captain Underpants Collection (Books 1–4; 1997–2000)
 Three More Wedgie-Powered Adventures in One (Books 4-6; 2006)
 The Second Captain Underpants Collection/The Tra-La-Larious Captain Underpants (Books 5–7 & Super Diaper Baby; 2001–2003)
 Captain Underpants: Three Pantastic Novels in One (Books 1–3; 1997–99)
 The New Captain Underpants Collection (Books 1–5; 1997–2000)
 The Tra-La-La Tremendous Captain Underpants Collection (Books 5–8; 2001–2006)
 The Complete Captain Underpants Collection (Books 1–8; 1997–2006)
 The Captain Underpants Collectors' Edition Collection (Books 1–3 + 3 CD-ROMs; 1997–1999, 2005–2008)

Captain Underpants in Full Color
 The Adventures of Captain Underpants (2013)
 Captain Underpants and the Attack of the Talking Toilets (2014)
 Captain Underpants and the Invasion of the Incredibly Naughty Cafeteria Ladies from Outer Space (and the Subsequent Assault of the Equally Evil Lunchroom Zombie Nerds) (2014)
 Captain Underpants and the Perilous Plot of Professor Poopypants (2015)
 Captain Underpants and the Wrath of the Wicked Wedgie Woman (2017) 
 Captain Underpants and the Big, Bad Battle of the Bionic Booger Boy Part 1: The Night of the Nasty Nostril Nuggets (2018)
Captain Underpants and the Big, Bad Battle of the Bionic Booger Boy Part 2: the Revenge of the Ridiculous Robo-Boogers (2018)
Captain Underpants and the Preposterous Plight of the Purple Potty People (2019)
Captain Underpants and the Terrifying Re-Turn of Tippy Tinkletrousers (2019)
Captain Underpants and the Revolting Revenge of the Radioactive Robo-Boxers (2020)
Captain Underpants and the Tyrannical Retaliation of the Turbo Toilet 2000 (2021)
Captain Underpants and the Sensational Saga of Sir Stinks-A-Lot (2022)*

Potentially cancelled books 
These books were reported "coming soon-ish" at the end of the books. No further information or cancellation has been released since their tease.

 The Captain Underpants Cartoon-O-Rama Book Heroes, Villains, and Supercreeps
 FrankenFart vs. The Bionic Barf Bunnies from Diarrhea Land (made appearances in Captain Underpants and the Preposterous Plight of the Purple Potty People and Cat Kid Comic Club) 
 The Adventures of Ook and Gluk Jr: Kung-Fu Cavekids in Outer Space (most likely completely cancelled due to the discontinuation of the first Ook and Gluk book)
 Captain Underpants Proudly Presents F.A.R.T.S. The Major Motion Picture

Controversy

Book bans
According to the American Library Association, the Captain Underpants books were reported as some of the most banned and challenged books in the United States between 2000 and 2009 (13), as well as between 2010 and 2019. The books were named one of the top ten most banned and challenged books in 2002 (6), 2004 (4), 2005 (8), 2012 (1), 2013 (1), and 2018 (3). The Captain Underpants series was explicitly banned in some schools for “insensitivity, offensive language, encouraging disruptive behavior, LGBTQIA+ issues, violence, being unsuited to the age group, sexually explicit content, anti-family content, as well as encouraging children to disobey authority.”

The American Library Association stated in a release by the National Coalition Against Censorship that "This year's #1 banned book, Captain Underpants... is the gift that keeps on giving. Why? Because these popular, silly books are read by parents, with their children, all over the country. The toilet humor makes parents roll their eyes and kids giggle. The absurdity of banning books to attack perceived moral problems is exemplified by this year's winner."

Depictions of homosexuality
In October 2015, the 12th book received controversy due to a reference to Harold being gay. Some elementary schools have banned the book due to this.

Removal of The Adventures of Ook and Gluk from publication
On March 29, 2021, Pilkey and Scholastic announced that The Adventures of Ook and Gluk would be ceasing further publication due to its use of unintentional and passive stereotypes, which Pilkey stated to be "harmful to everyone". Pilkey also announced that he would be donating all royalties from the book to organizations dedicated to stopping violence towards Asians and Asian-Americans.

Hiatus
Although the first few books came out regularly, the ninth book, Captain Underpants and the Terrifying Return of Tippy Tinkletrousers (advertised in a teaser at the end of the eighth book), was not released until 2012, after a six-year wait. During this time, Dav Pilkey was caring for his terminally ill father, who died in 2008. In 2009, he signed a deal with Scholastic for four new books, the first of which was The Adventures of Ook and Gluk: Kung-Fu Cavemen from the Future, released August 10, 2010. The second was Super Diaper Baby 2: The Invasion of the Potty Snatchers, released June 28, 2011. The third book, Captain Underpants and the Terrifying Return of Tippy Tinkletrousers, was released August 28, 2012. The fourth book, Captain Underpants and the Revolting Revenge of the Radioactive Robo-Boxers, was released January 16, 2013.

Other media

Film adaptation

CGI-animated film 

On October 20, 2011, it was reported that DreamWorks Animation had acquired rights to make an animated feature film based on the Captain Underpants series. On October 25, 2013, it was reported that Rob Letterman would direct the film, while Nicholas Stoller would write the script. It would have been the second film to have Letterman and Stoller working together, the first being Gulliver's Travels. On January 21, 2014, the cast was announced, with Ed Helms joining as Mr. Krupp/Captain Underpants; Kevin Hart as George Beard; Thomas Middleditch as Harold Hutchins; Nick Kroll as the insidious villain, Professor Poopypants; and Jordan Peele as Melvin, the nerdy nemesis of George and Harold. On June 12, 2014, the film was scheduled for release on January 13, 2017. Following DreamWorks Animation's reorganization in early 2015, the studio announced that the film would be produced outside of the studio's pipeline at a significantly lower cost. It would be instead animated at Mikros Image in Montreal, Canada, and it would look differently than most of DWA's films. A month later, Deadline reported that Letterman had left the project, and that David Soren, the director of Turbo, was in talks to direct the film, but Letterman returned to the project and served as an executive producer with Dav Pilkey. The film was expected to be released on March 10, 2017, but in September 2015, DreamWorks Animation's The Boss Baby took over its date. The film was released on June 2, 2017.

Television series
 Dav Pilkey had looked to turn the books into a possible TV series, and he had imagined Chris Farley in the titular role. Around the same year the first book debuted to the public, Farley died of a drug overdose. Defunct animation studio Soup2Nuts also attempted to produce an animated series based on the books in the early 2000s.

DreamWorks Animation produced a television series based on the film that was streamed to Netflix. It was released on July 13, 2018.

Interactive Special
In 2020, an interactive especial called Captain Underpants Epic Choice-o-Rama was released on Netflix. The special involves Harold and George stopping Mr. Krupp from blowing up their beloved treehouse.

Reception
Censors in the United States have been targeting the Captain Underpants series after the first book was released in 1997. The Office of Intellectual Freedom of the American Library Association reported that Captain Underpants is the book series with the most complaints from libraries due to offensive content in the United States in 2012 and 2013. Several parents accused the book of having language inappropriate for the book's target audience, children enrolled in elementary schools.

Jessica Roake, in an article published in Slate, argued that the books are well suited for young readers. She wrote that "They're drawn to them because for the first time in their reading lives they are understood, entertained, and catered to all at once. It is theirs, not ours, and that feeling of exclusive ownership forges the kind of connection everyone should have with at least one book in their life. For that, most every English teacher of my acquaintance will be more than happy to take the shot to the ego the Captain provides."

The series has frequently been compared with the Horace Splattly series, but not always positively.

International publishing
 Brazil: Cosac Naify (published all 12 volumes before closing its activities in 2015) | Companhia das Letras (re-releases; 2017–present)
 Canada, Argentina, Mexico, UK, Ireland, Hong Kong, India, Australia, New Zealand: Scholastic
 Catalan: Editorial Cruilla
 China: Nanhai Publishing Company
 Hong Kong: Thinkingdom/New Buds
 Taiwan: Commonwealth, Thinkingdom
 Croatia: Mozaik Knjiga
 Czech Republic: Egmont, Baronet
 Denmark: Forlaget Sesam, Carlsen
 Finland: Tammi
 France: Le Petit Musc (books 1–4; first translation); Bayard Presse (books 1–6)
 Germany, Austria: Ueberreuter (books 1–5; first translation); Panini (books 1–12)
 Greece: Modern Times, Psichogios Publications
 Hungary: Ulpius-Haz
 Iceland: JPV Forlag (Captain Underpants); Bókafélagið (Dog-Man)
 Indonesia: Kompas Gramedia Group
 Israel: Kinneret Zmora-Bitan Dvir
 Italy: Edizioni Piemme (Captain Underpants), Salani (Super Diaper Baby)
 Japan: Tokuma Shoten
  is the Japanese translator of the book series.
 Korea: Gimm-Young Publishers, Inc.
 Latvia: Zvaigzne ABC
 Lithuanian: Alma littera
 Norway: Cappelen Damm (1st and 2nd books; first translation); Schibsted Forlag (1st to 8th book), Vigmostad & Bjørke (from 9th book).
 Poland: Egmont, Jaguar
 Portugal: Gradiva (Captain Underpants); Marcador (Dog-Man)
 Romania: Editura National; Art Grup Editorial
 Russia: Machiny Tvoreniya Publishing
 Slovenia: Založba Mladinska Knjiga
 Spain: Ediciones SM
 Sweden: Egmont Richters (books 1–6; first translation); Bonnier Carlsen (books 1–12)
 Thailand: Pearl Publishing
 Turkey: A.I. Iletisim/Altin Kitaplar
 Ukraine: Krajina Mriy (Країна Мрій)
 United Kingdom: Scholastic, TedSmart
 Vietnam: Nha Nam Publishing

References

External links
 Captain Underpants at Scholastic 
 Captain Underpants

 
Works by Dav Pilkey
Series of children's books
Novels set in Ohio
Novel series
DreamWorks Classics
Obscenity controversies in literature
Fiction about hypnosis
American novels adapted into films
American novels adapted into television shows